Madgwick is a surname. Notable people with the surname include:

Robert Madgwick (1905–1979), Australian educationist
Rodney Madgwick, Australian judge
Sandra Madgwick (born 1963), English ballerina

Surnames of English origin